Kinomoto may refer to:

Kinomoto, Shiga, a former town in Ika District, Shiga Prefecture, Japan
Kinomoto Station, a railway station in Nagahama, Shiga, Japan

People with the surname
, Japanese footballer
, Japanese actor

Fictional characters
, protagonist of the manga series Cardcaptor Sakura

Japanese-language surnames